UEA Law School, founded in 1977, is a school within the University of East Anglia, dedicated to research and teaching in law. It is located in Earlham Hall, a seventeenth-century mansion situated on the edge of the UEA campus. From mid-2010 to early 2014, the school was temporarily located in the Blackdale School Building owing to essential renovation work. In national league tables UEA Law School has most recently been ranked 38th in the UK by The Guardian.

Academics

UEA Law School is a medium-sized law school. It has 23 full-time members of faculty who are assisted by 12 part-timers. The Head of the School is Professor Andreas Stephen, following Professor Peter Kunzlik, the former Head of the School, becoming Emeritus Professor in August 2017. The Professors are Michael Harker, Morten Hviid, David Mead, Rosemary Pattenden (Emeritus), Christopher Wadlow (Emeritus), Ian Smith (Emeritus), Peter Kunzlik (Emeritus), Stathis Banakas, Owen Warnock, Gareth Thomas and Rob Heywood.

Research

The 2008 Research Assessment Exercise rated 80% of the research as being at international level (2* and above), of which 40% was rated as being of either world-leading (4*) or internationally excellent quality (3*).

The School has research centres or groupings in the areas of Competition Law, Media and Internet Law and International Company and Commercial Law.

Additionally, members of the School have international reputations for research in Medical Law, Intellectual Property Law, Public Order law, Evidence, Criminal Justice and Procedure, Comparative Private Law, Contract, Tort and Restitution, and Family law. In addition to these School-based research clusters, many researchers in the School belong to formal networks which go beyond the Law School. For example, the School's competition lawyers are members of the ESRC Centre for Competition Policy [CCP] and Morten Hviid of the Law School took over from Catherine Waddams as Director of the CCP in September 2010.

Notable alumni

Law
Anna Marcoulli, Judge of the General Court (European Union)
Derek Pang, Justice of Appeal of the High Court of Hong Kong
Ashby Pate, Associate Justice of the Supreme Court of Palau
Laura Pillay, Judge of the Supreme Court of Seychelles
Hassan Al-Sayed, Judge of the Qatar International Court
Andrew Gordon-Saker, Senior Costs Judge
Dora Zatte, Ombudsman of the Seychelles

Politics
Mathias Cormann, Secretary-General of the OECD
Tariq bin Saeed bin Hilail Al-Shammari, Member of the Consultative Assembly of Saudi Arabia
Ivor Stanbrook, Conservative Member of Parliament
David Thomas, Labour Member of the European Parliament
Adam Tomkins, Conservative Member of the Scottish Parliament

Other
Wayne Barnes, rugby union referee
Jessica Draskau-Petersson, Olympic runner
Derek Gillman, Director of the Barnes Foundation
Carl Lygo, Vice-Chancellor of Arden University
Amir Muhammad, film director
Simon Nicholls, television producer

Notable faculty

Dame Beverley Lang, High Court Judge
Sir Clive Lewis, High Court Judge

References

External links
 Official Website
 Norwich Law School Working Papers

University of East Anglia
Law schools in England